Muldrow is a town in Sequoyah County, Oklahoma, United States. It is part of the Fort Smith, Arkansas-Oklahoma Metropolitan Statistical Area. The population was 3,466 at the 2010 census, an increase of 11.7 percent over the figure of 3,104 recorded in 2000.

The town was named in honor of Henry L. Muldrow, a U.S. Representative from Mississippi and friend of one of the settlement's founders. He used his influence with the railroad to have a depot located at the townsite. The inhabitants are properly referred to as Muldrovites. However, the term Muldrowan is often used.

Geography

Demographics

As of the census of 2000, there were 3,104 people, 1,204 households, and 846 families residing in the town. The racial makeup of the town was 69.59% White, 1.80% African American, 16.43% Native American, 0.29% Asian, 0.06% Pacific Islander, 1.32% from other races, and 10.50% from two or more races. Hispanic or Latino of any race were 3.70% of the population.

There were 1,204 households, out of which 32.9% had children under the age of 18 living with them, 51.2% were married couples living together, 15.4% had a female householder with no husband present, and 29.7% were non-families. 26.2% of all households were made up of individuals, and 11.7% had someone living alone who was 65 years of age or older. The average household size was 2.54 and the average family size was 3.08.

In the town, the population was spread out, with 28.1% under the age of 18, 9.1% from 18 to 24, 26.5% from 25 to 44, 22.7% from 45 to 64, and 13.7% who were 65 years of age or older. The median age was 35 years. For every 100 females, there were 91.5 males. For every 100 females age 18 and over, there were 83.3 males.

The median income for a household in the town was $26,216, and the median income for a family was $32,083. Males had a median income of $26,603 versus $18,984 for females. The per capita income for the town was $11,918. About 14.1% of families and 18.2% of the population were below the poverty line, including 20.2% of those under age 18 and 21.7% of those age 65 or over.

Government
The post office is located at 600 East Shawntel Smith Boulevard.

Education
Muldrow's public schools are Muldrow Elementary, Muldrow Middle School, and Muldrow High School. The elementary school is located on Main Street, while the high school and middle school are located on Shawntel Smith Boulevard.

Parks and recreation 
Muldrow City Park has a playground, a walking/jogging trail, two basketball courts, a volleyball court, a large covered pavilion, a children's splash pad, and a creek.  Special events are held there, including Old Settler's Day.

Muldrow Lake is to the northeast of town.  In one year’s spring Wildlife Department catch-and-release survey of lakes smaller than 1000 acres, Muldrow City Lake produced the most bass per hour, at 195.

Robert S. Kerr Reservoir, located in the picturesque Cookson Hills country and featuring 250 miles of rugged, irregular shoreline, is to the west-southwest.

Sequoyah’s Cabin Museum is about 12 miles north-northwest of town.   It features the actual one-room log cabin built in 1829 by Sequoyah, creator of the Cherokee written language, surrounded by a 10-acre park, and is complete with relics and documents associated with his life.  The site is listed on the National Register of Historic Places listings in Sequoyah County, Oklahoma.

Notable people
Charles Winchester Breedlove, Los Angeles City Council member, 1933–45
Shawntel Smith, Miss America 1996. The main street of the town, a stretch of U.S. Route 64, was renamed Shawntel Smith Boulevard in her honor.
Glen Condren, former NFL defensive lineman for the New York Giants and Atlanta Falcons. Played college football for the University of Oklahoma Sooners. Condren later returned to Muldrow to coach the local high school football team for a few years.
Jim Mundy/James White, a Top 40 Country Singer and award-winning songwriter (ten hit songs); #13 "The River's Too Wide"; #37 "She's Already Gone"
Master Sergeant Joshua L. Wheeler, killed in Iraq on October 22, 2015.

See also

List of places named after people in the United States
List of towns in Oklahoma

References

External links

Muldrow, Oklahoma at the Encyclopedia of Oklahoma History and Culture
Muldrow Public Library at the Eastern Oklahoma District Library System
Muldrow Public Schools

Fort Smith metropolitan area
Towns in Oklahoma
Towns in Sequoyah County, Oklahoma